(also known as Jikkyō G1 Stable) is a horse racing video game for the Nintendo 64. It was released only in Japan in 1999. A sequel has been released for the PlayStation 2, Jikkyō GI Stable 2. The game races horse in the G1 group.

References

1999 video games
Horse racing video games
Japan-exclusive video games
Konami games
Nintendo 64 games
Nintendo 64-only games
Video games developed in Japan